al-Aqsa Mosque may refer to:
 The Al-Aqsa Mosque compound, also known as the Haram al-Sharif, an extended religious sanctuary in Jerusalem covering the entirety of the area of the Temple Mount.
 The Al-Aqsa Mosque building, the congregational prayer hall also known as the Qibli Mosque/Chapel located at the southern end of the wider Al-Aqsa Mosque compound.

Other places 
 Aqsa Mosque, Rabwah, a mosque in Rabwah, Pakistan 
 Aqsa Mosque, Qadian, a mosque in Qadian, India

See also
 Al-Aqsa (disambiguation)